The Isuzu Gala (kana:いすゞ・ガーラ) is a heavy-duty rigid tourist coach produced by Isuzu through the J-Bus joint venture. The range of the first generation was available both with left-hand drive and right-hand drive.

First generation (1996-2005) 
KC-LV780/781/782 (1996)
Equipped with driver's airbag in 1997.
KL-LV774/780/781 (2000)
Guangzhou Gala

Second generation (2005-present) 

The Isuzu Gala second generation is a rebadged Hino S'elega.
ADG-RU1E/8J(2005)
PKG-RU1E/BDG-RU8J(2006)
LKG-RU1E/LDG-RU8J/SDG-RU8J(2010)
QPG-RU1E/QRG-RU1A/LDG-RU8J/SDG-RU8J (2012)
QRG-RU1E/QRG-RU1A/LDG-RU8J/SDG-RU8J (2014)

Model lineup 
First generation
Gala I HD (Hi-decker) 12m
Gala II SHD (Super hi-decker) 12m
Gala III GHD (Grace hi-decker) 12m
HD-9 9m
Second generation
SHD 12m
HD 12m
HD9 9m

See also 

 List of buses

References

External links 

Isuzu Gala Homepage

Coaches (bus)
Midibuses

Isuzu buses
Vehicles introduced in 1996
Full-size buses